The Cazalets is a 2001 television drama series in six episodes (five episodes when broadcast in the US) about the life of a large privileged family in the years 1937 to 1947. Most of the action takes place in London, and at the family's large estate in Sussex.

The drama was based on The Light Years and Marking Time, the first two novels in the series of five by Elizabeth Jane Howard, entitled The Cazalet Chronicles and first published in the 1990s. For the TV series, they were adapted by the screenwriter Douglas Livingstone and directed by Suri Krishnamma. The series was originally produced by Cinema Verity for BBC One and is available on DVD.

A BBC Radio 4 version in 45 episodes, in five series, was also produced later, broadcast between December 2012 and April 2014.

References

External links 
 
 The Cazalets: Cast and Credits
 The Cazalets: Programme Information

2001 British television series debuts
2001 British television series endings
2000s British drama television series
World War II television drama series
BBC television dramas
2000s British television miniseries
English-language television shows